Jank (stylized as JANK or J A N K !) was an American rock band from Philadelphia, Pennsylvania, formed in 2015.

History
Jank formed following the break-up of Downingtown, Pennsylvania duo Panucci's Pizza, which consisted of Lou (formerly Matt) Diamond and Brock Benzel. During Panucci's tenure, Diamond had been introduced to bassist Ruben Polo through mutual friends in the Philadelphia DIY scene, and they later met drummer Sam Becht during the trio's studies at the University of the Arts. After Diamond's other projects disbanded, they decided to start a new band containing light-hearted, tongue-in-cheek lyrics and upbeat, energetic instrumentals, in contrast to the emotional lyricism and acoustic instrumentation of Panucci's Pizza.

Spawned in the Kensington, Philadelphia basement DIY-punk scene, Jank played their first show in April 2015, and released their debut album, Awkward Pop Songs, later that year via Honest Face Records.

After a few months of touring North America to promote Awkward Pop Songs, they began to develop a cult following among the underground music scene throughout the United States. In early 2016 they recorded a new EP called Versace Summer. The band self-released a remixed version of Awkward Pop Songs, entitled Awkward Chopped Songs, on July 5, 2016 before releasing Versace Summer on July 27, 2016 through Creep Records.

Breakup and aftermath 
In early September 2016, in the midst of planning multiple tours with Modern Baseball and Sorority Noise, bassist Ruben Polo announced his departure from the band for undisclosed reasons. Following this announcement, vocalist/guitarist Lou Diamond posted a lengthy statement to the band's Facebook page, claiming they had been accused by various people in the Philadelphia DIY music scene of sexual abuse, and offered their perspective of the alleged incident. The band canceled all upcoming shows and tours, and shortly thereafter deleted all traces of their music on the internet, including all of their social media accounts. Their Bandcamp page would later be restored, and their music would also later be re-uploaded onto Spotify.

On August 31, 2017, Lou Diamond reappeared with ex-Jank drummer Sam Becht, and announced they had been working on a new project entitled fail better, heal faster. Released for free via Bandcamp, the release contained a link to a website with a disclaimer posted on it, stating that the project is "not a band" and is a one-off collection of songs intended to be a form of self-therapy for Lou to help cope with the impact the allegations had on their life from the previous year. There would be no promotion, no merchandise, and no tours centered around the project. fail better, heal faster was also released with the intention of sparking conversations in the DIY music scene regarding sexual abuse/abusers and how the behavior should not be tolerated or encouraged. It was claimed that any profits made from people who chose to donate money when downloading the album would be given to various charities including RAINN, The Centre for Justice & Reconciliation, Trans Youth Equality, and American Foundation for Suicide Prevention. However, four days after the album was released, many in the Philadelphia music community voiced concerns regarding the sincerity of the message, and as a result, revealed details of further allegations against Diamond not made public during the initial breakup of Jank. This information included screenshots of a previous band member stating that Lou Diamond, at the age of 21, had aggressively sexually assaulted a 15 year old. The subsequent release of information caused Becht to publicly distance himself from Diamond and all projects the two had previously worked on, much like Polo had done the year before. This signaled a more definitive end to Jank and the collaborative efforts of its members.

Polo continued to play in the band Soul Glo, while Becht joined Remo Drive as a touring drummer and released an album, Selfie in 2019.

In 2019, Becht joined a new band called Oolong. They are currently signed to Sun-Eater Records.

On June 4, 2021, a B-side album was released on streaming services titled "B-Sides and Dem-O's". It consisted of demos from 'Awkward Pop Songs and Versace Summer, and unreleased songs.

 Members 
Lou Diamond – guitar, vocals (2015-2016)
Ruben Polo – bass guitar (2015-2016)
Sam Becht – drums (2015-2016)

Timeline

Discography
Studio albumsAwkward Pop Songs (Honest Face Records, 2015)

EPsVersace Summer (Creep Records, 2016)

Remix albumsAwkward Chopped Songs'' (Self-released, 2016)
Compilation Albums

• B-Sides and Dem-Os (Self-released, 2021)

References

Musical groups from Philadelphia
Musical groups established in 2015
2015 establishments in Pennsylvania
Emo revival groups
American emo musical groups